Tkhkot or Tamasha is a village de jure in the Kalbajar District of Azerbaijan, but de facto in the Martakert Province of the self-proclaimed Republic of Artsakh. It is suspected that this village has undergone a name change or no longer exists, as no Azerbaijani website mentions it under this name.

References 

Populated places in Kalbajar District
Abolished villages in Kalbajar District